Nickerson is an unincorporated community in Nickerson Township, Pine County, Minnesota, United States.

The community is located between Sandstone and Duluth along State Highway 23 (MN 23); near the boundary line for Pine and Carlton counties.

The Nemadji River flows through the community. The Nemadji State Forest is nearby. The communities of Duquette, Kerrick and Holyoke are all near Nickerson.

History

The community of Nickerson in northern Pine County was named after John Quincy Adams Nickerson of Elk River, Minnesota; who promoted the construction of the line of the Great Northern Railway that connected Sandstone to Duluth. Nickerson had a post office from 1895 to 1954.

References

 Rand McNally Road Atlas – 2007 edition – Minnesota entry
 Official State of Minnesota Highway Map – 2011/2012 edition

Unincorporated communities in Minnesota
Unincorporated communities in Pine County, Minnesota